Thats What They All Say is the debut studio album by American rapper Jack Harlow. It was released on December 11, 2020, by Generation Now and Atlantic Records. The album features guest appearances from Lil Baby, Big Sean, Chris Brown, Adam Levine, EST Gee, Bryson Tiller, DaBaby, Tory Lanez and Lil Wayne, the latter three appear on the remix of Harlow's breakout single, "Whats Poppin".

Background 
In an interview with iHeartRadio, Harlow shared the story behind the album title.
You know, I've heard it all before. It's taken long enough for me to get to this point that I've developed some thick skin. And so it's really given me a chance to just let everything kinda fly off my shoulder and it doesn't bother me as much. I know who I am. So Thats What They All Say is a response. I've heard it all before. There's nothing you can tell me.

Music and lyrics 
The album is a "collection of laid-back anthems". On the album, Harlow "pays homages to his Louisville roots while still affirming that his eyes are set on goals far beyond where he started." "Rendezvous" and "Face of My City" features southern trap production while "Luv Is Dro" is R&B.

Critical reception 

Quincy of Ratings Game Music wrote that Harlow "impresses with big-boy punchlines, impressive flows, sly-ass lyrics, and sneaky good melodies." On the other hand, he pointed out that "Jack could’ve covered a broader range of topics on the album."

Danny Schwartz of Rolling Stone wrote that Harlow "put Louisville rap on the national radar for the first time in a generation, and his music is strongest when he keeps it close to home." Meanwhile, he noted that his music is similar to that of Drake.

Kate Hutchinson of The Guardian wrote that "his most interesting songs are the more introspective ones, where he addresses being uncomfortable about his acclaim (Keep It Light) and his white privilege (Baxter Avenue)" and "these songs hint that there might be more to come from Harlow than everything you’ve already heard before."

Imogen Lawlor of Vinyl Chapters wrote that the album "shows incredible maturity, depth and understanding of his interactions with others", which is achieved through "playful production, immense musicality and blunt lyricism intelligently manipulated to profoundly articulate ambivalent sentiments about relationships and life more generally."

Commercial performance
Thats What They All Say debuted at number five on the US Billboard 200, with 51,000 album-equivalent units (2,000 including pure album sales) in its first week. The album also accumulated a total of 66.21 million on-demand streams of the album's songs during the tracking week.

Track listing

Notes
  signifies a co-producer
  signifies an additional producer
  signifies an uncredited co-producer
  signifies an uncredited additional producer
 "21C / Delta" features additional vocals by Millie Go Lightly, and background vocals by Alexandria Dopson
 "Funny Seeing You Here" features additional vocals by Tess Henley
 "Keep It Light" features spoken word by Maggie Harlow; Jack's mother
 "Same Guy" features additional vocals by Jason Clayborn and The Atmosphere Changers

Sample Credits
 "Rendezvous" contains samples from "Lost for Words", written by George Patterson, as performed by Midnight Movers.
 "Keep It Light" contains samples from "Dirt and Grime", written by Nicholas Smith, as performed by Father's Children.
 "Luv Is Dro" contains samples from "Love Is Dro", written by Stephen Garrett, Alonzo Lee, Jr., and Shamar Daugherty, as performed by Static Major.
 "Baxter Avenue" contains samples from “Glass Hearted”, written by Dylan Teixeira, as performed by Nami.

Charts

Weekly charts

Year-end charts

Certifications

References

2020 debut albums
Jack Harlow albums
Atlantic Records albums
Albums produced by Boi-1da
Albums produced by Cubeatz
Albums produced by DJ Dahi
Albums produced by Harry Fraud
Albums produced by Hit-Boy
Albums produced by Keyz (producer)
Albums produced by Scott Storch
Albums produced by Skrillex
Albums produced by Sonny Digital